The 1930 NCAA Track and Field Championships was the ninth NCAA track and field championship.  The event was held at Stagg Field in Chicago, Illinois in June 1930.    The University of Southern California won the team title.  The highlight of the meet was a new world record in the 100-yard dash, as Frank Wykoff ran the event in 9.4 seconds.  Wykoff's time broke the prior world record of 9.5 seconds set by Eddie Tolan.

Team scoring
University of Southern California - 57-27/70
Washington - 40
Iowa - 30-1/7
Ohio State - 29-1/10
Stanford - 28
Illinois - 27-17/70
Michigan - 20-1/7
Indiana - 20
Oregon - 12
Wisconsin - 11-1/10

Track events

100-yard dash
Frank Wykoff, USC - 9.4 seconds (new world record)
George Simpson, Ohio State
Edwin Toppino, Loyola (New Orleans)
Eddie Tolan, Michigan
Claude Bracey, Rice

120-yard high hurdles
Steve Anderson, Washington - 14.4 (equals world record)
Lee Sentman, Illinois
James Hatfield, Indiana
W. Lamson, Nebraska
John Morris, Southwest Louisiana Institute

220-yard dash
George Simpson, Ohio State - 20.7 seconds (new NCAA record)
Cy Leland, Texas Christian
Eddie Tolan, Michigan
C.M. Farmer, North Carolina
Allen East, Chicago

220-yard low hurdles
Lee Sentman, Illinois - 23.2 seconds (equals NCAA record)
Richard Rockaway, Ohio State
Steve Anderson, Washington
O.R. Welch, Missouri
E. Payne, USC

440-yard dash
Reginald Bowen, Pitt - 48 seconds
Victor Williams, USC
Russell Walter, Northwestern
A. Wilson, Notre Dame
T. Hartley, Washington

880-yard run
Orval Martin, Purdue - 1:54.2 (new NCAA record)
Dale Letts, Chicago
B. Little, Notre Dame
Ralph Wolf, Northwestern
William McGeagh, USC

One-mile run
Joseph Sivak, Butler - 4:19.3
Rufus Kiser, Washington
Joseph Mackeever, Illinois
Ray Swartz, Western Michigan
L. Erwall, Carleton College

Two-mile run
Harold Manning, Wichita - 9:18.1 (new NCAA record)
H.A. Brockwaithe, Indiana
W.E. Clapham, Indiana
Russell Putnam, Iowa State
C.E. Meisinger, Penn State

Field events

Broad jump
Edward Gordon, Iowa - 25 feet
Ed Hamm, Georgia Tech
R. Barber, USC
D. Hamilton, Colorado
D. Graydon, Georgia Tech

High jump
James Stewart, USC - 6 feet, 3-3/4 inches
M. Ehrlich, Kansas City State Agricultural College
R. Bowa, Mississippi A&M
M. Strong, Southwestern State Teachers
C. Bradey, Louisville
Parker Shelby, Oklahoma

Pole vault
Tommy Warne, Northwestern - 13 feet, 9 inches (new NCAA record)
L.L. Lansrud, Drake
W. Hubbard, USC
P. Miller, Washington University, St. Louis
R. Robinson, Oregon

Discus throw
Paul Jessup, Washington - 160 feet, 9-3/8 inches (new NCAA record)
Eric Krenz, Stanford
Eugene Moeller, Oregon
Hall, USC
Harlow Rothert, Stanford

Javelin
Kenneth Churchill, California - 204 feet, 2 inches
L. Friedman, Geneva College
Jess Mortensen, USC
L.D. Weldon, Iowa
O.E. Nelson, Iowa

Shot put
Harlow Rothert, Stanford - 52 feet, 1-3/4 inches (new NCAA record)
Eric Krenz, Stanford
H. Rhea, Nebraska
Paul Jessup, Washington
Sam Behr, Wisconsin

Hammer throw
Holly Campbell, Michigan - 162 feet, 8-1/4 inches
J.M. Gilchrist, Iowa
Arthur Frisch, Wisconsin
W.J. Youngerman, Iowa
J.O. Hart, Iowa

See also
 NCAA Men's Outdoor Track and Field Championship

External links
Highlights

References

NCAA Men's Outdoor Track and Field Championship